Marlens was a commune in the Haute-Savoie department in the Rhône-Alpes region in south-eastern France.
On 1 January 2016 it was merged with Cons-Sainte-Colombe to create the new commune Val-de-Chaise.
There's a popular paragliding site on the hillside to the north of the village. The paragliders land at the village itself.

See also
Communes of the Haute-Savoie department

References

Former communes of Haute-Savoie
Populated places disestablished in 2016